Memorial and Museum of Martyred Turks Massacred by Armenians or Iğdır Genocide Memorial and Museum (Turkish: Iğdır Soykırım Anıt-Müzesi) is a memorial-museum complex which promotes Armenian genocide denial. The construction for the memorial started on 1 August 1997 and it was dedicated on 5 October 1999 in Iğdır, Turkey.

In an address at the monument's opening ceremony, Minister of State Ramazan Mirzaoğlu claimed that Armenians killed almost 80,000 people in Iğdır between 1915 and 1920; the Turkish president Süleyman Demirel was also present.

The stated aim of the memorial is to "commemorate massacres and persecution committed by Armenians in Iğdır Province" during World War I and the Turkish–Armenian War. The memorial was built to further Armenian genocide denial and the disproven narrative that, during World War I, it was Armenians who killed Turks rather than vice versa. French journalists Laure Marchand and Guillaume Perrier call the monument "the ultimate caricature of the Turkish government's policy of denying the 1915 genocide by rewriting history and transforming victims into guilty parties". Bilgin Ayata on Armenian Weekly criticized the memorial as "aggressive, nationalistic, and outright hostile." The European Armenian Federation for Justice and Democracy announced that the memorial is designed to deny the Armenian genocide and demanded its closure.

Gallery

See also
 Anti-Armenian sentiment
 DARVO – Deny, Attack, Reverse Victim & Offender
 Genocide denial
 Ottoman casualties of World War I
 Persecution of Muslims during the Ottoman contraction

References

External links 
 

Monuments and memorials in Turkey
Ottoman casualties of World War I
World War I memorials
Monuments and memorials in Iğdır
Armenian genocide denial